Josias, Hereditary Prince of Waldeck and Pyrmont (13 May 1896 – 30 November 1967) was the heir apparent to the throne of the Principality of Waldeck and Pyrmont and a general in the SS. From 1946 until his death, he was the head of the Princely House of Waldeck and Pyrmont. After World War II, he was sentenced to life in prison at the Buchenwald Trial (later commuted to 20 years) for his part in the "common plan" to violate the Laws and Usages of War in connection with prisoners of war held at Buchenwald concentration camp, but was released after serving about three years in prison.

Early years

He was born in Arolsen at the ruling family's castle, the eldest son and heir of Prince Friedrich of Waldeck and Pyrmont and his consort Princess Bathildis of Schaumburg-Lippe. He was the nephew of William II, King of Württemberg, and Emma of Waldeck and Pyrmont, Queen Regent of the Netherlands. He was also a cousin of Wilhelmina, Queen of the Netherlands, and Charles Edward, Duke of Saxe-Coburg and Gotha. He enlisted in the German Army as a cadet and fought in the First World War, where he suffered serious injuries. At the end of the war, his family lost their Principality as Waldeck and Pyrmont became a Free State in the new Weimar Republic.

SS career

After the war, Waldeck-Pyrmont studied agriculture. On 1 November 1929, he joined Adolf Hitler's Nazi Party, becoming a member of the SS on 2 March 1930. He was immediately appointed adjutant to Sepp Dietrich, before becoming Reichsführer-SS Heinrich Himmler's Adjutant and staff chief in September 1930.

Waldeck-Pyrmont was elected as the Reichstag member for Düsseldorf-West in 1933 and was promoted to the rank of SS Lieutenant General. He was promoted again in 1938, to the Higher SS and Police Leader for Weimar. In this position he had supervisory authority over Buchenwald concentration camp.

Buchenwald had first caught the attention of Waldeck in 1941 when, glancing over the camp's death list, he came across the name of Walter Krämer, a head hospital orderly at Buchenwald. He recognized it because Krämer had successfully treated him in the past. Waldeck investigated the case and discovered Karl-Otto Koch, the camp's commandant, had ordered both Krämer and Karl Peix (a hospital attendant) killed as "political prisoners" because they had treated him for syphilis, a fact Koch wished to keep secret. Waldeck also received reports that a certain prisoner had been shot while attempting to escape. By that time, Koch had been transferred to the Majdanek concentration camp in Poland, but his wife, Ilse, was still living at the Commandant's house in Buchenwald. Waldeck ordered a full-scale investigation of the camp by Georg Konrad Morgen, an SS major who was a judge in a German court. Throughout the investigation, more of Koch's orders to kill prisoners at the camp were revealed, as well as evidence of embezzlement of property stolen from prisoners. It was also discovered that the prisoner who was "shot while trying to escape" had been told to get water from a well some distance from the camp, then was shot from behind; he had also helped treat Koch for syphilis. A charge of incitement to murder was lodged against Koch by Waldeck-Pyrmont and Morgen, to which later was added a charge of embezzlement. Other camp officials were also charged, including Ilse Koch. The trial resulted in a death sentence for the Commandant, who was executed by firing squad on 5 April 1945. Morgen was convinced that Ilse Koch was guilty of sadistic crimes, but could not prove the charges against her; she was detained by German authorities until early 1945.

Adolf Hitler appointed Waldeck-Pyrmont a member of the Ordnungspolizei (uniformed police) in April 1941 and, a year later, he was appointed High Commissioner of Police in German-occupied France. One of his first acts in his new role was ordering French hostages to be placed on German troop trains, to discourage sabotage attempts on them. He was made a general in the Waffen-SS in July 1944.

Arrest and later life

Waldeck-Pyrmont was arrested on 13 April 1945, and sentenced to life imprisonment by an American court at Dachau during the Buchenwald Trial on 14 August 1947. The first of the two successful charges against him alleged that he was personally responsible for crimes at Buchenwald, since the camp was located in his jurisdictional area, notwithstanding the fact that he was never in command of it, and that he even investigated the commandant of the camp for incitement to murder and embezzlement. The second charge was that he had ordered the execution of the Camp Commandant of Buchenwald, SS-Standartenführer Karl Otto Koch, after it was discovered Koch had disgraced both himself and the SS. Military Governor of Germany, General Lucius D. Clay ordered that the sentences of the Buchenwald Trial be re-examined on the basis of extensive records and, on 8 June 1948, confirmed fifteen of the death sentences and commuted seven. Most of the imprisonment sentences were also commuted, including Waldeck-Pyrmont's (from life to twenty years). Waldeck-Pyrmont was taken to Landsberg am Lech, where he served only three years of his sentence before being released in December 1950 for health reasons. He was granted an amnesty by the Minister President of Hesse in July 1953, which resulted in a significant reduction of the fine imposed on him.

Head of the House of Waldeck and Pyrmont

Waldeck-Pyrmont became head of the House of Waldeck and Pyrmont upon the death of his father, on 26 May 1946, while under arrest. He died at his primary estate, Schloss Schaumburg, in 1967, and was succeeded as head of the house by his only son Prince Wittekind.

Family

Waldeck-Pyrmont married Duchess Altburg of Oldenburg (1903–2001), a daughter of the former Grand Duke of Oldenburg, Friedrich August II, on 25 August 1922 at Rastede. They had five children:
Princess Margarethe of Waldeck and Pyrmont (22 May 1923 – 21 August 2003); her son Eberhard would marry Alexandra Reuss, granddaughter of Princess Marie Adelheid of Lippe
Princess Alexandra of Waldeck and Pyrmont (25 September 1924 – 4 September 2009)
Princess Ingrid of Waldeck and Pyrmont (b. 2 September 1931)
Prince Wittekind of Waldeck and Pyrmont (b. 9 March 1936)
Princess Guda of Waldeck and Pyrmont (b. 22 August 1939), married Friedrich Wilhelm, Prince of Wied, grandson of William Frederick, Prince of Wied.

Ancestry

See also
List of SS-Obergruppenführers

Notes

Sources

1896 births
1967 deaths
People from Bad Arolsen
Princes of Waldeck and Pyrmont
Nazi Party politicians
Young German Order members
SS and Police Leaders
German Army personnel of World War I
German prisoners sentenced to life imprisonment
20th-century Freikorps personnel
Royalty in the Nazi Party
Members of the Reichstag of the Weimar Republic
Members of the Reichstag of Nazi Germany
Recipients of the clasp to the Iron Cross, 1st class
Recipients of the Gold German Cross
Recipients of the War Merit Cross
Heirs apparent who never acceded
Waffen-SS personnel
SS-Obergruppenführer
People convicted in the Dachau trials
Prisoners sentenced to life imprisonment by the United States military
Sons of monarchs